Takht-e Bastam may refer to:
 Takht-e Bastam-e Olya
 Takht-e Bastam-e Sofla